Darling Buds of May is the debut and only album by the rock band Faulter. It was released on September 19, 2006 on Abacus Recordings.

Track listing
All tracks by Andy Carpenter except where noted.

Personnel 
Kevin Augunas – engineer
Andy Carpenter – producer, mixing
Jason Freese – organ
Josh Freese – drums
Skip Hahn – pedal steel
Greg Koller – engineer
Jon Saint James – producer, mixing, management
Jason Upright – A&R
Ben Wilson – artwork, layout design

References

External links
Official Faulter Site

Faulter albums
2006 debut albums